Kalonia may refer to:

 Harter Kalonia, a Star Wars character

See also
 Kalona